Frederick Morgan "Fred" Hansen (born December 29, 1940) is an American former athlete who competed mainly in the pole vault.

A 1963 graduate of Rice University, he competed for the United States in the 1964 Summer Olympics held in Tokyo, Japan in the pole vault where he won the gold medal.

1964 Olympics
Going into the 1964 Olympics, the United States had never lost an Olympic pole vault competition.  In the final, the last remaining American was Hansen, who at the time was also the world record holder.  The field included two other previous world record holders and decathlete C. K. Yang.  Hansen cleared 5 meters on his first attempt, but so did three German athletes.  Hansen then passed the next height, watching as only Wolfgang Reinhardt was able to clear.  Re-entering the competition at 5.10, Hansen failed his first two attempts, but so did Reinhardt.  Hansen then sailed over his final attempt, while Reinhart could not.  Hansen continued the American streak, which would survive through one more Olympics until the 1972 pole vault controversy, when defending champion Bob Seagren had his pole confiscated at the games and had to compete on an unfamiliar, borrowed pole.

Other achievements
Besides pole vault Hansen competed in the long jump. He was also an avid golfer and played at the 1980 U.S. Amateur golf championship. He currently is a practicing dentist in Houston, Texas, in the Memorial area of town.  He was Inducted into the Texas Track and Field Coaches Hall of Fame, Class of 2016.

References

External links

 Fred Hansen at Sporting Heroes
 

1940 births
Living people
American male pole vaulters
American Presbyterians
Athletes (track and field) at the 1964 Summer Olympics
World record setters in athletics (track and field)
Medalists at the 1964 Summer Olympics
Olympic gold medalists for the United States in track and field
Rice Owls men's track and field athletes
Rice University alumni
People from Cuero, Texas
Track and field athletes from Texas